The following article presents a summary of the 1995 football (soccer) season in Brazil, which was the 94th season of competitive football in the country.

Campeonato Brasileiro Série A

Semifinals

|}

Final

Botafogo declared as the Campeonato Brasileiro champions by aggregate score of 3-2.

Relegation
The worst placed team in each one of the two groups in the first stage of the competition, which are Paysandu and União São João, were relegated to the following year's second level.

Campeonato Brasileiro Série B

Atlético Paranaense declared as the Campeonato Brasileiro Série B champions.

Promotion
The two best placed teams in the final stage of the competition, which are Atlético Paranaense and Coritiba, were promoted to the following year's first level.

Relegation
The two worst placed teams in all the four groups in the first stage, which are Democrata-GV and Ponte Preta, were relegated to the following year's third level.

Campeonato Brasileiro Série C

Quarterfinals

|}

Semifinals

|}

Final

Vila Nova declared as the Campeonato Brasileiro Série C champions by aggregate score of 3-0.

Promotion
The champion and the runner-up, which are XV de Piracicaba and Volta Redonda, were promoted to the following year's second level.

Copa do Brasil

The Copa do Brasil final was played between Corinthians and Grêmio.

Corinthians declared as the cup champions by aggregate score of 3-1.

State championship champions

Youth competition champions

Other competition champions

Brazilian clubs in international competitions

Brazil national team
The following table lists all the games played by the Brazil national football team in official competitions and friendly matches during 1995.

Women's football

Brazil women's national football team
The following table lists all the games played by the Brazil women's national football team in official competitions and friendly matches during 1995.

The Brazil women's national football team competed in the following competitions in 1995:

Domestic competition champions

References

 Brazilian competitions at RSSSF
 1995 Brazil national team matches at RSSSF
 1995 Brazil women's national team matches at RSSSF

 
Seasons in Brazilian football
Brazil